Decyl polyglucose is a mild non-ionic synthetic surfactant. It is a type of alkylpolyglycoside derived from glucose or starch and the fatty alcohol decanol.  It is commonly used in body washes and shampoos.

References

Glucosides
Polymers
Non-ionic surfactants